Olearia ilicifolia is a shrub or small tree endemic to New Zealand. Common names include Māori-holly, mountain holly, hakeke or hākēkeke and New Zealand holly. It is a spreading shrub or small tree of the family Asteraceae, and has largely serrated and undulating grey-green leaves. It is closely related to the sub-alpine Olearia macrodonta, with which it shares the names mountain holly and New Zealand holly, however it is much more common than Olearia macrodonta.

Description
Its flowers are white with yellow centres and grow in large terminal corymbs.

References

ilicifolia
Plants described in 1864